Lukas Deinhofer (born 20 March 1994) is an Austrian professional footballer who plays as a right-back for Austrian Football Second League club SKU Amstetten.

References

External links 

Living people
1994 births
Austrian footballers
2. Liga (Austria) players
SKU Amstetten players
Association football defenders
People from Amstetten, Lower Austria
Footballers from Lower Austria